Philippa Claire Wilson MBE (born 7 February 1986 in Southampton) is an English professional sailor.

She won a gold medal in the Yngling sailing class in the 2008 Summer Olympics in Beijing, together with Sarah Webb and Sarah Ayton.

Wilson was appointed Member of the Order of the British Empire (MBE) in the 2009 New Year Honours.

Pippa started her sailing career in the well renowned youth class dinghy, the Cadet then progressed to the 29er, 420, 470 then Yngling.

References

External links
 

Living people
1986 births
English female sailors (sport)
Sportspeople from Southampton
Yngling class world champions
World champions in sailing for Great Britain
English Olympic medallists
Olympic medalists in sailing
Olympic sailors of Great Britain
Olympic gold medallists for Great Britain
Sailors at the 2008 Summer Olympics – Yngling
Medalists at the 2008 Summer Olympics
Members of the Order of the British Empire
Extreme Sailing Series sailors